Carey House may refer to:

 Carey House (Denison, Iowa), United States
 Carey House (Wichita, Kansas), listed on the National Register of Historic Places (NRHP) in Sedgwick County, Kansas
 J. W. Carey House, Prosser, Washington, listed on the NRHP in Washington state, in Benton County